Dactyladenia laevis is a species of plant in the family Chrysobalanaceae. It is endemic to Gabon, where it is found only in the vicinity of Libreville. It is threatened by habitat loss due to extensive logging.

References

laevis
Endemic flora of Gabon
Taxa named by Émile Auguste Joseph De Wildeman